Stephanitidae is an extinct family of cephalopod belonging to the ammonite superfamily Noritoidea.

References 
 The Paleobiology Database

Noritoidea
Ceratitida families